There have been a number of named passenger trains in Mexico.  The named trains that are operating include:

Former named trains include:

See also 
 List of Mexican railroads
 Rail transport in Mexico

References 

Mexico